Tanandava may refer to one of the following locations in Madagascar:

Tanandava, Andapa in Andapa District, Sava Region, Madagascar
Tanandava, Bekily in Bekily District, Androy Region, Madagascar

See also
Tanandava Sud (Tanandava Atsimo) in Amboasary Sud District, Anosy Region, Madagascar